Andinobates geminisae is a species of poison-dart frog.

Description 
This small frog is 11 to 13 mm long and is a chrome orange in colour. The feet do not have any webbing and females are slightly larger than the males.

Distribution and habitat 
The habitat of A. geminisae is lush rainforest. This animal is found in Panama.

Behaviour and reproduction 

The call of this amphibian is buzz-like. Cupped leaves full of water are used as areas to lay their eggs.

References 

Amphibians described in 2014
geminisae